Wila Qullu (Aymara wila blood, blood-red, qullu mountain, "red mountain", also spelled Wila Kkollu) is a mountain in the Andes of Bolivia, about  high. It is situated in the Oruro Department, Sajama Province, Turco Municipality. Wila Qullu lies north-east of the mountain Qutallani and south-west of Wintu Qachi.

References 

Mountains of Oruro Department